PGIMER and Capital Hospital, or in its full name Post Graduate Institute of Medical Education and Research and Capital Hospital Bhubaneswar, is a Public hospital and Medical school and tertiary referral government hospital. It is located at the Bhubaneshwar city of Odisha, India.

References

Medical colleges in Odisha
Universities and colleges in Odisha
Educational institutions established in 1954
1954 establishments in Orissa